Maoritomella ischna is a species of sea snail, a marine gastropod mollusk in the family Borsoniidae.

Description
The height of the shell attains 8.5 mm, its width 2.25 mm.

Distribution
This marine species occurs off New Zealand and off Tasmania (Australia)

References

 Powell, A.W.B. 1979: New Zealand Mollusca: Marine, Land and Freshwater Shells, Collins, Auckland
 Spencer H.G., Willan R.C., Marshall B.A. & Murray T.J. (2011). Checklist of the Recent Mollusca Recorded from the New Zealand Exclusive Economic Zone

External links
 
  Bouchet P., Kantor Yu.I., Sysoev A. & Puillandre N. (2011) A new operational classification of the Conoidea. Journal of Molluscan Studies 77: 273–308

ischna
Gastropods of New Zealand
Gastropods described in 1881